D75 may refer to:

 a standard illuminant : see Standard illuminant#Illuminant series D
 D 75 road (United Arab Emirates)
 Neo-Grünfeld Defence, Encyclopaedia of Chess openings code

See also
 75D (disambiguation)
 75 (disambiguation)